Fox Docos is an Australian subscription television channel which focuses on broadcasting various documentary films and docuseries. The channel launched on September 1, 2021, replacing Foxtel Arts on both Foxtel and Binge, with former programming moving to the new channel.

Programming 
The channel consists of both acquired and original programming, including sports documentaries and non-fiction content from HBO. The first local program to be produced for the channel, Walking with Hope, premiered on September 2, 2021, one day after the channel's launch.

References 

Television networks in Australia
English-language television stations in Australia
Foxtel
Television channels and stations established in 2021
2021 establishments in Australia